Dorcadion tauricum is a species of beetle in the family Cerambycidae.

Description
They are black, although the legs are brownish-red. The antennae are brownish-red to black, although the first segment is red. The suture and marginal strips are bright, the remnants of the shoulder band are visible.

References

tauricum
Beetles described in 1838
Taxa named by Joseph Waltl